Ludovico Prodocator  or Podochatero, Podocatharo, Podocatharus, Podacatharus, Podocathro (? in Cyprus – 24 August 1504) was a cardinal of the Catholic Church. He was bishop of Capaccio.

He was private secretary and possibly physician to Rodrigo Borgia, later Alexander VI, and also to Innocent VIII.  He rose through the church hierarchy and was made cardinal on 19 February 1500 by Pope Alexander VI.  In September 1503, he was considered likely to be elected to the papacy. However, Francesco Todeschini Piccolomini was elected as Pius III.  He is buried in the Basilica of Santa Maria del Popolo.

References

External links and additional sources
 (for Chronology of Bishops) 
 (for Chronology of Bishops) 
 (for Chronology of Bishops) 
 (for Chronology of Bishops) 

Greek cardinals
Cardinals created by Pope Alexander VI
Cypriot bishops
People from Nicosia
15th-century births
1504 deaths